Robert McGaw (14 February 1875 – 18 June 1945) was a Scottish gymnast. He competed in the men's team all-around event at the 1908 Summer Olympics.

References

External links
 

1875 births
1945 deaths
British male artistic gymnasts
Olympic gymnasts of Great Britain
Gymnasts at the 1908 Summer Olympics
Sportspeople from Dumfries and Galloway